Uncinais is a genus of annelids belonging to the family Naididae.

The species of this genus are found in Eurasia and Northern America.

Species:
 Uncinais golyschkinae Akinschina, 1984 
 Uncinais minor Sokolskaja, 1962 
 Uncinais uncinata (Ørsted, 1842)

References

Annelids